Karun Chandhok  (born 19 January 1984) is an Indian racing driver and television presenter who last competed in Formula E for Mahindra Racing. Before this, he drove in the GP2 Series for three years, winning two races. In 2013, Chandhok competed in the FIA GT Series for Seyffarth Motorsport.

Prior to his time in GP2, Chandhok won the Formula Asia championship in 2001 and was the inaugural Formula Asia V6 by Renault champion in 2006. Since leaving F1, Chandhok has served as an analyst, co-commentator and pit-lane reporter for a variety of British broadcasters. Since 2019, he has been a member of the Sky Sports F1 live coverage team.

Chandhok has contributed to several motorsport governing bodies. Since 2021, he has served on the Board of Directors of Motorsport UK, where he has also been a member of the Equality, Diversity and Inclusion Committee. He is also a member of the FIA Driver's Commission.

Early career
Chandhok was born in Madras (present-day Chennai), Tamil Nadu and is the son of Vicky Chandhok, multiple Indian rallying champion and president of the Federation of Motor Sports Clubs of India since 2003. His younger brother Suhail Chandhok is a commentator for Star Sports India.

In 2000, Chandhok was Indian National Racing Champion winning seven out of ten races in the Formula Maruti series. He scored pole position and fastest lap in all ten races. In 2001, Chandhok was the Formula 2000 Asia champion, becoming the youngest ever Asian Formula Champion, driving for Team India Racing.

Chandhok tested with British Formula 3 champion team Carlin Motorsport in 2001. He raced in the National class in 2002, driving for T-Sport, finishing sixth in class. He stayed with T-Sport in the National Class for 2003, and finished third in the final class standings, behind champion Ernesto Viso and runner-up Steven Kane. In 2004 Chandhok stepped up to the main British Formula 3 class with T-Sport, and finished 14th in the standings.

He was instantly a top 5 qualifier and finisher when he partnered his compatriot Narain Karthikeyan at RC Motorsport in the World Series by Nissan for the final two rounds the 2004 season.

With Karthikeyan moving on to Formula One in 2005, Chandhok raced part-season in the revised Formula Renault 3.5 Series with RC Motorsport. He was the first driver to represent A1 Team India in A1 Grand Prix at the beginning of the 2005–06 season, before handing over to Armaan Ebrahim for the remainder of the season.

In 2006 he became champion of the first ever Formula Asia V6 by Renault Championship, taking seven race wins and nine pole positions from 12 races.

GP2 Series

Chandhok moved to the GP2 Series in 2007, driving for Durango. Chandhok's first win in GP2 came in the sprint race at the Spa-Francorchamps circuit in Belgium. Chandhok also led the sprint race in Turkey after starting from pole, only for the second place Kazuki Nakajima of DAMS to collide with him. The collision resulted in retirement for Chandhok while Nakajima was given a drive-through penalty.

Chandok got his biggest career break in November with a call up from the Red Bull Racing Formula One team to test for them over two days at the Circuit de Catalunya in Barcelona on 13–14 November.

Chandhok remained in GP2 for 2008, switching to the iSport International team where he was partnered by Bruno Senna.  He won one race and finished tenth in the drivers' championship. He also drove for the team in the 2008 GP2 Asia Series season. After winning one race and finishing tenth in the championship, Chandhok was presented with the series' "Best Driving Style" award at the end of the season.

In November, Chandhok became the first Indian driver to be invited to join the British Racing Drivers' Club. India's membership of the Commonwealth entitles him to be a member.

Chandhok signed to drive for the Ocean Racing Technology team in the 2009 GP2 Series season. Even though the deal with ORT was for the pan-European series, Chandhok also drove in the final round of the 2008–09 GP2 Asia Series season, in Bahrain replacing Yelmer Buurman. Chandhok amassed ten points in the championship, with a best result of third at Silverstone. He and teammate Álvaro Parente suffered a testing season, with sixteen retirements between them.

Formula One

Force India links
It was an Indian registered-team formerly owned by a friend of the family, Vijay Mallya. After the team's driver, Giancarlo Fisichella, moved from Force India to Ferrari during the 2009 season, Chandhok was briefly linked with the seat, with long-time supporter Bernie Ecclestone supporting him. The team's test driver, Vitantonio Liuzzi, was instead promoted to the race seat.

Chandhok believed that the commercial benefits for the team running an Indian driver make him an obvious choice.

HRT (2010)

At Chandhok's first race, the 2010 Bahrain Grand Prix, he was unable to complete a lap in any of the free practice sessions as his car was still being completed and then suffered hydraulic problems. He was, however, able to use the qualifying session to run his F110 for the first time. He qualified last on the grid, 1.7 seconds behind Senna, who had completed laps earlier in the meeting, and crashed out of the race after just one lap due to a large bump in the tarmac which sent him crashing into the wall. Chandhok recorded the team's first classified finish when he ended up fourteenth in Australia. In Malaysia he finished 15th, and finished 17th in China. Chandhok retired in the next three races with suspension failure in Spain, an accident with Jarno Trulli in Monaco and more technical problems in Turkey. He finished 18th in Canada and Valencia, and 19th at Silverstone, but was dropped for the  onwards, in favour of Sakon Yamamoto. For all the following races he was a co-commentator on BBC Radio 5 Live's coverage of the sport.

Lotus (2011)

On 22 March 2011, Chandhok was confirmed as a reserve driver at Team Lotus for the  season. He finished 20th and last, two laps behind teammate Heikki Kovalainen and a lap behind 19th placed Daniel Ricciardo. He was also 4 laps behind race winner Lewis Hamilton.

Chandhok was let go by Team Lotus after the Japanese Grand Prix, meaning he could not take part in his home Grand Prix 3 weeks later in India. Tony Fernandes and Chandhok came to a financial settlement, but it was not completed until April 2013.

Endurance Racing: 2012
For 2012, Chandhok drove in the FIA World Endurance Championship for JRM Racing in a Honda Performance Development ARX-03a with co-drivers David Brabham and Peter Dumbreck. At the Le Mans 24 Hours, Chandhok's team finished sixth overall out of the 56 starters.

FIA GT Series: 2013
Chandhok drove in the FIA GT Series for the 2013 season in a last minute deal for Seyffarth Racing. He was joined in the car by Jan Seyffarth, who had been competing in the German GT series for his family run team. Chandhok joined Armaan Ebrahim, who became the first Indian driver to be confirmed in the series.

Formula E: 2014–2015

In 2014–2015, Chandhok drove the inaugural season of Formula E for Mahindra Racing.

Media career
Chandhok has worked for a variety of British broadcasters as part of their coverage of Formula One including the BBC and Channel 4. As of 2021, he works for Sky Sports as an analyst as well as occasional co-commentator and pit-lane reporter. He also appeared on the Channel 5 programme Fifth Gear as a presenter and reporter.

Racing record

Career summary

Complete Formula Renault 3.5 Series results
(key)

Complete A1 Grand Prix results
(key)

Complete GP2 Series results
(key) (Races in italics indicate fastest lap)

Complete GP2 Asia Series results
(key)

Complete Formula One results
(key)

 Driver did not finish the Grand Prix, but was classified as they had completed over 90% of the race distance.

24 Hours of Le Mans results

Complete FIA World Endurance Championship results

Complete FIA GT Series results

Complete Formula E results
(key) (Races in bold indicate pole position; races in italics indicate fastest lap)

Complete European Le Mans Series results

References

External links

 
 

1984 births
Living people
Punjabi people
Motorsport people from Chennai
Indian expatriates in the United Kingdom
Indian racing drivers
British Formula Three Championship drivers
A1 Team India drivers
Formula V6 Asia drivers
GP2 Series drivers
GP2 Asia Series drivers
Indian Formula One drivers
HRT Formula One drivers
Team Lotus (2010–11) Formula One drivers
World Series Formula V8 3.5 drivers
24 Hours of Le Mans drivers
FIA World Endurance Championship drivers
European Le Mans Series drivers
Formula E drivers
JK Tyre National Level Racing Championship drivers
Formula One journalists and reporters
Motorsport announcers
T-Sport drivers
Mahindra Racing drivers
A1 Grand Prix drivers
RC Motorsport drivers
Durango drivers
ISport International drivers
Ocean Racing Technology drivers
Murphy Prototypes drivers
Carlin racing drivers